The following lists events that happened during 1877 in Chile.

Incumbents
President of Chile: Aníbal Pinto

Events

January
3 January - The clipper Champion of the Seas is abandoned off Cape Horn

May
9 May - 1877 Iquique earthquake

Births
3 November - Carlos Ibáñez del Campo (d. 1960)

Deaths
20 July - Federico Errázuriz Zañartu (b. 1825)

References 

 
Years of the 19th century in Chile
Chile